Bayet may refer to:

People
 Albert Bayet (born 1880), French sociologist
 Charles Bayet (1849–1918), French historian
 Hugues Bayet, Belgian politician
 Jean Bayet (1892–1969), French Latinist
 Jean-Baptiste Annibal Aubert du Bayet (1759–1797), French general and politician
 Lucy Bayet, Australian fashion model

Places
 Bayet, Allier, Auvergne-Rhône-Alpes, France
 Bayet Peak, Antarctica